Thomas Raymond Willoughby (22 February 1889 – 19 August 1964) was an Australian rules footballer who played with Fitzroy in the Victorian Football League (VFL).

Notes

External links 

1889 births
1964 deaths
Australian rules footballers from Western Australia
Australian Rules footballers: place kick exponents
Fitzroy Football Club players
Perth Football Club players